Gobbler Hill is a historic home located at Chestertown in Kent County, Maryland, United States. It was built in 1858 and is a center-hall plan frame house on a foundation of local fieldstone and brick. It is five bays wide, two bays deep, and two stories tall with late Greek Revival / early Italianate style details. It features a shallow hip roof surmounted by a tall belvedere and a full-width porch.

It was listed on the National Register of Historic Places in 2009.

References

External links

, at Maryland Historical Trust

Houses on the National Register of Historic Places in Maryland
Houses completed in 1858
Houses in Kent County, Maryland
National Register of Historic Places in Kent County, Maryland